ʻAbd al-Qayyūm (ALA-LC romanization of ) is a male Muslim given name. It is built from the Arabic words ʻabd and al-Qayyūm, one of the names of God in the Qur'an, which give rise to the Muslim theophoric names. It means "servant of the eternal".

It may refer to:

Abdul Qayyum
Sahibzada Abdul Qayyum (1863–1937), Indian educationalist
Abdul Qayyum Khan (1901–1981), Pakistani politician
Abdul Qayyum "Zakir", alleged real name of Abdullah Gulam Rasoul (born ca. 1973), Afghan held in Guantanamo
Abdul Qayyum (general), Pakistani Lieutenant General
Abdul Qayyum Jamal, Pakistani-Canadian accused of terrorism
Abdul Qayyum Sajjadi, Afghan politician
Mohammad Abdul Qayyum Khan (1924–2015), Azad Kashmir activist and politician

Abdul Qayum
Abdul Qayum Karzai (born 1947), Afghan politician, brother of Hamid Karzai
Abdul Qayum (imam) (born 1960), Bangladeshi-born British imam of the East London Mosque

Abdul Qayoom
Abdul Qayoom (cricketer) (born 1967), Indian cricketer and coach
Abdul Qayyum Sajjadi, Afghani politician representing Ghazni Province in Afghanistan's Wolesi Jirga

Others
Abdol Ghayoom Ebrahimi (born 1932), founder of Gorgan University, Iran
Maumoon Abdul Gayoom (born 1937), President of the Maldives
Abdul Kaium (born 1948), Bangladeshi police officer, Inspector General of Bangladesh Police (2005–2006)
Abdil Qaiyyim Mutalib (born 1989), Singapore footballer

References

Arabic masculine given names